Tamba is a village in Lääneranna Parish, Pärnu County, in southwestern Estonia, on the coast of the Gulf of Riga. It had only nine inhabitants on 1 January 2011.

The eastern part of the village is within the Paadrema Nature Reserve.

References

Villages in Pärnu County